Ana Carolina Vieira (born October 24, 2001, in São Paulo) is a Brazilian swimmer. She represented Brazil at the 2020 Summer Olympics.

Career
At the 2018 José Finkel Trophy, she broke the South American record in  freestyle relay with a time of 7:50.57 along with Camila Mello, Maria Paula Heitmann and Andressa Cholodovskis.

At the 2018 Summer Youth Olympics held in Buenos Aires, she won a silver medal in the Girls' 4 × 100 metre freestyle relay. It was the first time that a Brazil's women's relay won a swimming medal on a world level. She also won another silver medal in the Mixed 4 × 100 metre freestyle relay, finished 4th in the Girls' 4 × 100 metre medley relay, 18th in the Girls' 100 metre freestyle, 28th in the Girls' 200 metre freestyle and 32nd in the Girls' 100 metre breaststroke.

Vieira represented Brazil at the 2020 Summer Olympics in the women's 4 × 100 metre freestyle relay event, finishing 12th.

She was at the 2022 World Aquatics Championships held in Budapest, Hungary. Participating in the Brazilian  freestyle relay, formed by Giovanna Diamante, Stephanie Balduccini, Vieira and Giovana Reis, she finished in 6th place with a time of 3:38.10. This was the first time Brazil had qualified a women's relay for a World Aquatics Championships final since 2009, and the best placement of the country in this race in Worlds at all times. She also finished 10th in the Women's 4 × 100 metre medley relay, along with Stephanie Balduccini, Jhennifer Conceição and Giovanna Diamante.

References

External links

2001 births
Living people
Brazilian female breaststroke swimmers
Brazilian female freestyle swimmers
Swimmers from São Paulo
Olympic swimmers of Brazil
Swimmers at the 2018 Summer Youth Olympics
Swimmers at the 2020 Summer Olympics
21st-century Brazilian women
South American Games gold medalists for Brazil
South American Games silver medalists for Brazil
South American Games medalists in swimming
Competitors at the 2018 South American Games
Competitors at the 2022 South American Games